Shirvan-Salyan Economic Region is one of the 14 economic regions of Azerbaijan. It borders Iran to the west, as well as the economic regions of Mil-Mughan, Central Aran, Mountainous Shirvan, Absheron-Khizi, Baku, and Lankaran-Astara. The region consists of the districts of Bilasuvar, Hajigabul, Neftchala, Salyan, as well as the city of Shirvan. Its population was estimated to be at 501.3 thousand people in January 2021.

History 
Shirvan-Salyan Economic Region was established on 7 July 2021 as part of a reform of the economic region system of Azerbaijan. Its territory was part of the larger Aran Economic Region prior to 2021.

References 

Economic regions of Azerbaijan